The legislative districts of Lanao del Sur are the representations of the province of Lanao del Sur in the various national legislatures of the Philippines. The province is currently represented in the lower house of the Congress of the Philippines through its first and second congressional districts.

History 

Prior to gaining separate representation, areas now under the jurisdiction of Lanao del Sur were represented under the Department of Mindanao and Sulu (1917–1935) and the historical Lanao Province (1935–1961).

The enactment of Republic Act No. 2228 on May 22, 1959 divided the old Lanao Province into Lanao del Norte and Lanao del Sur, and provided them each with a congressional representative. In accordance with Section 8 of R.A. 2228, the incumbent representative of Lanao Province, Laurentino Badelles, also represented Lanao del Sur until voters of the new province elected their separate representative in the next general election, which took place in 1961. The chartered city of Dansalan (renamed to Marawi in 1956), despite being enumerated as part of the territory of neither successor province, was designated as Lanao del Sur's seat of provincial government and became part of its lone congressional district.

Lanao del Sur was represented in the Interim Batasang Pambansa as part of Region XII from 1978 to 1984, and returned two representatives, elected at large, to the Regular Batasang Pambansa in 1984.

Under the new Constitution which was proclaimed on February 11, 1987, the province was reapportioned into two congressional districts; each elected its member to the restored House of Representatives starting that same year.

1st District 
City: Marawi
Municipalities: Amai Manabilang (Bumbaran), Buadiposo-Buntong, Bubong, Ditsaan-Ramain, Kapai, Lumba-Bayabao, Maguing, Marantao, Masiu, Mulondo, Piagapo, Poona Bayabao, Saguiaran, Tagoloan II, Tamparan, Taraka, Wao
Population (2020): 686,512

Notes

2nd District 
Municipalities: Bacolod-Kalawi (Bacolod Grande), Balabagan, Balindong, Bayang, Binidayan, Butig, Calanogas, Ganassi, Kapatagan, Lumbatan, Lumbayanague, Madalum, Madamba, Malabang, Marogong, Pagayawan, Picong (Sultan Gumander), Pualas, Tubaran, Tugaya, Sultan Dumalondong (established 1995), Lumbaca-Unayan (established 2004)
Population (2020): 509,006

Notes

Lone District (defunct) 

Notes

At-Large (defunct)

See also 
Legislative district of Mindanao and Sulu
Legislative district of Lanao

References 

Lanao del Sur
Politics of Lanao del Sur